Antoniotto Invrea (Genoa, 1588 - Genoa, 1669) was the 116th Doge of the Republic of Genoa, king of Corsica and marquis of Pontinvrea.

Biography 
In his dogate, the seventy-two year sequence and centosedicesimo in republican history, Invrea maintained diplomatic and political relations with the France of Louis XIV and the  England of Charles II. In the role of the highest office of the state, he attended the party at the Doge's chapel in Doge's Palace for the marriage of his son Ottaviano to Sofonisba Raggio.

See also 

 Republic of Genoa
 Doge of Genoa

References 

17th-century Doges of Genoa
1588 births
1669 deaths